Sainte-Anne-du-Lac was a former village municipality in L'Amiante Regional County Municipality in the Chaudière-Appalaches region of Quebec.  On October 24, 2001, it merged into the municipality of Adstock and ceased to exist.

References

Former municipalities in Quebec
Populated places disestablished in 2001